Eynat Guez
is an Israeli technology entrepreneur and executive. She is the CEO and co-founder of Papaya Global, a payroll and payments provider.

Biography
Eynat Guez was born in France, the second of three children.  She immigrated with her family to Israel when she was four years old. The family settled in Netanya.  In her youth, she was a journalist for TV shows on  Channel 2 and Israeli Educational Television and the newspaper Ma'ariv La'noar and was a competitive swimmer. 

She served in the  Israel Defense Forces as an F-16 Squadron adjutant.

Guez holds a BA in Political science and Business administration from the Open University of Israel. She lives in Emek Hefer with her husband and three children.

Business career
Guez served for seven years as a COO of LR Group, a Holding company that built infrastructures and established projects in Africa. In 2008, after seven years in LR Group, she quit her job.  Early 2009, she founded Relocation Source, her first company, which supports corporate relocation and worldwide mobility needs and still exists today. 
Four  years later, she established a second company, Expert Source, which assisted companies expanding into East Asia. 

In 2016, she founded Papaya Global, with Ofer Herman (CTO) and Ruben Drong (CPO). The company is valued at $3.7 billion. 

It is the first Israeli Unicorn led by a woman.

Awards and recognition
2018 – No. 4 among 20 Women in HR Technology by People Matters. 
2021 – No. 8 in The Jerusalem Post’s 50 most influential Jews. 
2021 – No. 82 in TheMarker's most influential people. 
2021 – No. 49 in Calcalist’s most influential people. 
2022 - No. 31 in Forbes Israel Power Women. 
2022 – Globes’ 50 influential women. 
2022 – Fintech's top 10 founder-CEOs, Fintech Magazine. 
2022 – No. 9 on Fortune's The 15 Most Powerful Women in Startups.

See also
Women in Israel

References

Israeli Jews
Israeli people of French-Jewish descent
People from Netanya
20th-century Israeli businesswomen
21st-century Israeli businesswomen
Israeli women chief executive officers
Open University of Israel alumni